In molecular biology, the catalase-related immune-responsive domain is a protein domain found in catalases. This domain carries the immune-responsive amphipathic octa-peptide that is recognised by T cells.

References

Protein families